Katherine Gilmore Richardson is a Democratic politician and at-large member of the Philadelphia City Council. Gilmore Richardson was elected to an at-large seat on the Philadelphia City Council in 2019, becoming the youngest Black woman to serve on the city council.

Early life and education 
Gilmore Richardson was born to a teenage mother from South Philadelphia and adopted at birth by Rev. Lorraine Jenkins Gilmore and James William Gilmore. She was raised in Philadelphia and attended the Julia R. Masterman Laboratory and Demonstration School and then the Philadelphia High School for Girls. 

She attended West Chester University, earned a bachelor's in political science and a master's in administration with a concentration in public administration, and became a member of Zeta Phi Beta. She spent two years teaching as a substitute teacher at Overbrook High School where she taught math and computer science. In 2017, she completed The Campaign School program at Yale University.

Political career 
In 2008, Gilmore Richardson began working as a City Council staff member in the office of Blondell Reynolds Brown. Reynolds Brown met Gilmore Richardson when the latter was a junior at Girls High, their shared alma mater. Over 11 years, Gilmore Richardson worked in almost every position in her office, including Chief of Staff, before deciding to run for City Council in 2019. She was endorsed by the Philadelphia Democratic City Committee and The Philadelphia Inquirer in the Democratic primary, and placed in the top 5 with 7% of the votes, advancing to the general election. 

In the November 2019 general election, she won the City Council At-Large seat, placing 4th out of seven candidates with 14.2% of the vote. She is the youngest Black woman to be elected to Philadelphia City Council. She has stated, "My work is a continuation of former At-Large City Councilperson Blondell Brown’s trailblazing legacy that was passed on from former City Councilmember Augusta Clark and Dr. Ethel Clark," and has expressed interest in using social media platforms for outreach to young constituents.

Philadelphia City Council

Committee assignments 
:

 Commerce And Economic Development
 Disabled and Persons With Special Needs
 Environment (chair)
 Global Opportunities And Creative Innovative Economy
 Housing, Neighborhood Development, and the Homeless
 Labor and Civil Service
 Licenses and Inspections
 Rules
 Streets and Services

Issues

Employment 
In February 2020, she introduced legislation that would give preference to graduates of career and technical education programs of the School District of Philadelphia.

Police reform 
In June 2020, Gilmore Richardson introduced a bill to require public hearings prior to adopting labor contracts, including the agreement with Fraternal Order of Police Lodge #5. This legislation was passed by City Council in September 2020. In October the Fraternal Order of Police Lodge #5 sued the city over the legislation, and Gilmore Richardson said the measure creates "transparency and accountability" for the police.

Education 
In February 2021 at a rally with the Philadelphia Federation of Teachers against the premature resumption of in-person learning, Gilmore Richardson said "As a former teacher, as a mother, and a councilmember, I'm angry. We should not have teachers in this position. Ever." She called for a vaccination plan for teachers and stated, "As we near the one-year anniversary of the pandemic, getting children back into classrooms throughout the city is vitally important to their future."

Voting 
To commemorate the 100th anniversary of the Nineteenth Amendment, Gilmore Richardson introduced a resolution to ceremonially change the nickname of the city of Philadelphia to "The City of Sisterly Love" for the duration of 2020.

Arts and culture
In March 2021, Gilmore Richardson and Councilmember Isaiah Thomas moved to transfer $1.3 million to support artists and art organizations from the City recession relief fund.

Licenses and Inspections
In March 2022, Gilmore Richardson and Councilmember Squilla introduced Bill 220299  to require the installation of automatic fire sprinkler systems in additional high-rise buildings.

Personal life
She married David Rasheed Richardson on July 12, 2014, at Grace Community Church of God of Prophecy. She has three children.

See also
List of members of Philadelphia City Council since 1952

References

Philadelphia City Council members
1984 births
Living people
Politicians from Philadelphia
West Chester University alumni
21st-century African-American politicians
21st-century American politicians